Paraflavitalea is a Gram-negative, strictly aerobic and motile genus of bacteria from the family of Chitinophagaceae with one known species (Paraflavitalea soli). Paraflavitalea soli has been isolated from greenhouse soil from Yongin in Korea.

References

Chitinophagia
Bacteria genera
Monotypic bacteria genera
Taxa described in 2020